Sangathamizhan is a 2019 Indian Tamil-language action drama film written and directed by Vijay Chandar. The film stars Vijay Sethupathi in the titular role with Raashii Khanna, Nivetha Pethuraj, Soori, Nassar, Ravi Kishan, and Ashutosh Rana play pivotal roles. The music is composed by Vivek-Mervin, and cinematography was handled by R. Velraj. Principal photography reportedly commenced during February 2019 in Hyderabad. The film was released on 15 November 2019, with received highly negative reviews, and was a flop at the box-office.

Plot 
Murugan is a happy-go-lucky youngster and aspiring actor in Chennai who mostly roams around with his sidekick, Soori . One day, Murugan meets Kamalini, who is the daughter of the wealthy industrialist, Sanjay, owner of Sanjay Industries. The relationship between the two starts off sour, but later become romantic. Sanjay initially plans to finish off Murugan, when he found out Murugan's relationship with Kamalini. But to his shock, he finds that Murugan looks exactly like one of his old enemies, Sangathamizhan.

Many years earlier, Sangathamizhan and his family including his lover and cousin, Thenmozhi stopped the launch of Sanjay's copper factory in their village due to the toxic effects on the villagers caused by the waste from the factory. In retaliation, Sanjay killed Sangathamizhan and his family with the help of Kulandaivel, who is a fellow politician and the former best friend of Sangathamizhan's father during a festival. Now, Sanjay strikes a deal with Murugan and asks him to act as Sangathamizhan so that he can help him establish the copper factory in the village.

It is eventually revealed that Murugan is actually Sangathamizhan, alive and well. He had survived the explosion that annihilated his family and is hell-bent on avenging their deaths by killing Sanjay. Sangathamizhan comes to Sanjay's base where he fights Sanjay and Kulandaivel, ultimately emerging successful. The film ends with the copper factory sealed shut by the court and in an interview with the press, he says that as long as all the villagers are united, anything is possible to achieve.

Cast 

 Vijay Sethupathi as Sangathamizhan / Murugan
 Raashii Khanna as Kamalini (Voice dubbed by Raveena Ravi)
 Nivetha Pethuraj as Thenmozhi "Thenu" 
 Soori as Soori
 Nassar as Devaraj
 Ravi Kishan as Sanjay
 Ashutosh Rana as Kulandaivel
 Sriman as Venkatesh
 Soundararaja as Murugan
 Rajendran as Kittappa
 Mime Gopi as Gopi
 G. Marimuthu as Murugan's brother-in-law
 Madhan Bob as Professor
 Ramana as Ramana
 Amit Tiwari as Amit
 Billy Murali as Sanjay's henchman
 Karate Rajkumar as Sanjay's henchman
 Yogi Ram as Sanjay's henchman
 Sriram Parthasarathy as Thenmozhi's father
 Tulasi as Sangathamizhan's mother
 Sriranjini as Thenmozhi's mother
 Deepa Shankar as Murugan's sister
 Indhumathi as Thenmozhi's aunt
 Tamil Selvi as Gopi's wife
 Anandhi as Thenmozhi's cousin
 Manju as Manju
 K. S. G. Venkatesh as Venkatesh
 Besant Ravi as Rowdy
 George Vijay Nelson as Gopal
 Supergood Subramani
 Aananya Mani as Bhagyalakshmi
 Kalloori Vinoth as Muthu
 Lallu as Sangathamizhan's friend
 Suryakanth as Moorthy
 Bharat Raj as Samraj's son
 Pondy Ravi as Sanjay's assistant
 Chengalpattu Maran as Raghu
 Gajaraj as Samraj
 Akalya Venkatesan as Soori's girlfriend
 Kadhal Saravanan as man in a pub
 John Vijay as Criminal (cameo appearance)
 Bala Singh as Political party leader
 Ramji as himself (cameo appearance)
 Raju Sundaram in a special appearance in the song "Oh My God"
 Vijay Chandar in a special appearance in the song "Oh My God"

Production 
The film directed by Vijay Chandar marks his third directorial venture after Vaalu and Sketch both of them being regarded as average collection in box office. The filming began during February 2019 and the first schedule wrapped up in the city of Hyderabad. Two female leads Raashi Khanna and Nivetha Pethuraj were roped in by the filmmakers and thus the duo make their first collaboration with Vijay Sethupathi. The second schedule of the film concluded in Pondicherry as of early April 2019. The film also saw Vijay Sethupaty and Soori first time in Hero Comedian duo.

Soundtrack 

D. Imman was initially speculated to compose music for the film, but he was replaced by Vivek-Mervin, collaborating with actor Vijay Sethupathi and director Vijay Chandar for the first time. The album features six tracks, lyrics for the songs were written by Viveka, Madhan Karky, Ku. Karthik and Prakash Francis. The audio rights of the film was secured by Sony Music India. The first single "Kamala" was released on 24 August 2019 sung by Vivek Siva and Sanjana Kalmanje. The second single "Sandakari Neethan" was released on 15 September 2019 sung by Anirudh Ravichander, Jonita Gandhi and Mervin Solomon. The third single track "Azhagu Azhagu" and the full tracklist was released on 25 October 2019. The complete soundtrack album was launched on 26 October 2019 at the office of Sun TV Network, Chennai.

Behindwoods rated the album 2.75 out of 5, and stated "Vivek-Mervin duo has delivered the variety that will appeal to the mass and melody song listeners." Moviecrow also gave the same rating and stated that "Sangathamizhan is another minimum guarantee soundtrack from Vivek Mervin and though the soundtrack has nothing extraordinary to offer, it has its occasional sparks." A review from The Times of India stating that "The soundtrack checks all the boxes of a typical Tamil entertainer, only a few are off the beaten path."

Despite the album received mixed reviews, the song "Kamala" was liked by music listeners and turned out to become an instant hit.

Release 
The film was released on 15 November 2019.

References

External links 
 

2019 films
Indian action films
2010s Tamil-language films
2010s masala films
2019 action films
Indian films about revenge